Mehmet Ekici (born 25 March 1990) is a Turkish footballer who most recently played as a midfielder for Fenerbahçe.

He previously played for Werder Bremen, 1. FC Nürnberg, Bayern Munich, and Trabzonspor. Born in Germany, Ekici played for the Germany national football team at Under-17 to Under-21 level before switching to represent Turkey in senior competition.

Club career

Bayern Munich
Ekici made his debut for Bayern Munich's first team in the 2008 T-Home Super Cup. He was named in Bayern Munich's squad for both the 2008–09 and 2009–10 UEFA Champions League. In January 2010, it was announced that Ekici would train with the first-team for the rest of the 2009–10 season, along with reserve teammates David Alaba and Diego Contento, and on 1 February, he followed Contento in signing a contract with the senior team. He scored 12 goals in 29 matches for the reserve team during the 2009–2010 season. He was an unused substitute for a few first-team matches before injury ruled him out of the end of the season.

Nürnberg (loan)
In July 2010, he joined 1. FC Nürnberg on a season-long loan.

Werder Bremen
On 18 May 2011, Ekici transferred to Werder Bremen for a reported fee of around €5 million. He scored his first goal for Bremen on 17 September, against his former club 1. FC Nürnberg in match that ended in a 1–1 draw. On 1 September 2013, he scored two goals leading his team to a 4–1 win over VfB Stuttgart.

Trabzonspor
Ekici joined Trabzonspor on 15 August 2014 for a fee of €1.5 million. He made his league debut on 31 August 2014 against Kayseri Erciyesspor, which ended in a 0–0 draw.

He left the club at the end of the 2016–17 season when his contract ran out. In his time at Trabzonspor, he made 83 appearances scoring 16 goals in all competitions.

Fenerbahçe
On 5 June 2017, Fenerbahçe S.K. announced the signing of Ekici.

International career
Although he has represented Germany, the nation of his birth, at youth and U21 levels, he has elected to play for Turkey at the senior level. He was called up to Turkish side by Guus Hiddink for the friendly match against the Netherlands. On 29 March 2011, Ekici represented Turkey in his first major international match against Austria where he played right-wing with Turkish play-maker Arda Turan on the left-wing, which resulted in Turkey winning the match 2–0 and getting their UEFA Euro 2012 qualification back on-track. Ekici went with Turkish manager Guus Hiddink to 1. FC Nürnberg to try to persuade his close friend İlkay Gündoğan to follow in his paths in playing for Turkey.

Career statistics

Club
.

Honours
Bayern Munich
 Bundesliga: 2009–10
 DFB-Pokal: 2009–10

References

External links

 
 
 
 
 
 Mehmet Ekici at kicker.de 
 Interview with Cezasahasi.net 

1990 births
Living people
Turkish footballers
Turkey international footballers
Citizens of Turkey through descent
German footballers
Germany under-21 international footballers
Germany youth international footballers
German people of Turkish descent
Association football midfielders
FC Bayern Munich footballers
FC Bayern Munich II players
1. FC Nürnberg players
SV Werder Bremen players
Trabzonspor footballers
Fenerbahçe S.K. footballers
Bundesliga players
3. Liga players
Regionalliga players
Süper Lig players
Footballers from Munich